Laurence C. "Cary" Leeds III (April 16, 1957 - January 30, 2003) was an American professional tennis player.

Leeds was the son of New York City banker Larry Leeds and Tel Aviv-born Dalia Benary. A varsity tennis player while at Yale University, Leeds won a national indoor doubles title with Matt Doyle in 1977 and graduated in 1979 with a B.A.

Active on the professional tour in the 1980s, Leeds featured most prominently in doubles and made three Grand Prix finals. He was a mixed doubles semi-finalist at the 1981 Wimbledon Championships, partnering Sherry Acker.

The Cary Leeds Center in the South Bronx, New York is named in his honor, set up by his family as a way to memorialize him after his death in 2003. It was opened in 2015.

Grand Prix career finals

Doubles: 3 (0–3)

References

External links
 
 

1957 births
2003 deaths
American male tennis players
Yale Bulldogs men's tennis players
Tennis people from New York (state)
Jewish tennis players
American people of Israeli descent